Gurudwara Reetha Sahib is situated in Champawat district, Uttarakhand, India. It is 16 hours journey away from Chandigarh (581 km) approx. This gurudwara holds a very sacred place in Sikh Religion as Guru Nanak Dev himself had visited this place with Bhai Mardana.

Religious importance

Gurdwara Meetha Reetha Sahib was constructed around year 1960 and is situated near the village Deyuri in Uttrakhand. Guru Nanak Dev Ji visited this place with Bhai Mardana Ji. There were Jogis sitting under the reetha (soapnut) trees. Guru Nanak Dev ji sat under a reetha tree and asked Bhai Mardana Ji to eat a reetha. Reethas are usually bitter in taste but the reetha which Guru Nanak Dev Ji plucked for Bhai Mardana Ji was sweet. Jogis were surprised by all this and later they come to know that on which side Guru Nanak Dev Ji was sitting all the reethas has become sweet. These trees are still there in the Gurudwara and the reethas are still said to be sweet in taste. This is the reason why this place is called Meetha Reetha Sahib. Even today the people who visits the Gurudwara gets sweet reethas (soapnuts) as prashad. Due to its religious background this place is considered as a holy place for Sikhs. The temple of Devnath is also located beside the Gurudwara. On Baisakhi purnima, Sikh fair is held in this Gurudwara as this place is very sacred. Gurudwara's first caretaker was Lala Baisakhi Ram from Haldwani.

Gurdwaras in Uttarakhand
Sikh places
Champawat district
20th-century gurdwaras